Hoplopholcus is a genus of cellar spiders that was first described by Władysław Kulczyński in 1908.

Species
 it contains ten species, found only in Asia and Europe:
Hoplopholcus asiaeminoris Brignoli, 1978 – Turkey
Hoplopholcus atik (Huber, 2020) – Turkey
Hoplopholcus bursa (Huber, 2020) – Turkey
Hoplopholcus cecconii Kulczyński, 1908 – Turkey, Israel, Lebanon
Hoplopholcus dim (Huber, 2020) – Turkey, Cyprus
Hoplopholcus figulus Brignoli, 1971 – Greece
Hoplopholcus forskali (Thorell, 1871) (type) – Eastern Europe to Turkmenistan
Hoplopholcus gazipasa (Huber, 2020) – Greece, Turkey
Hoplopholcus konya (Huber, 2020) – Turkey
Hoplopholcus labyrinthi (Kulczyński, 1903) – Greece (Crete)
Hoplopholcus longipes (Spassky, 1934) – Greece, Turkey, Caucasus (Russia, Georgia)
Hoplopholcus minotaurinus Senglet, 1971 – Greece (Crete)
Hoplopholcus minous Senglet, 1971 – Greece (Crete)
Hoplopholcus patrizii (Roewer, 1962) – Turkey
Hoplopholcus suluin (Huber, 2020) – Turkey
Hoplopholcus trakyaensis Demircan & Topçu, 2017 – Turkey (European part)

See also
 List of Pholcidae species

References

Araneomorphae genera
Spiders of Europe
Pholcidae
Spiders of Asia